Hazel Run is an unincorporated community in northeastern St. Francois County, in the U.S. state of Missouri. The community is located one-half mile south of Hazel Run creek and approximately five miles east-northeast of Bonne Terre.

History
A post office called Hazel Run was established in 1844, and remained in operation until 1928. The community takes its name from nearby Hazel Run creek.

References

Unincorporated communities in St. Francois  County, Missouri
Unincorporated communities in Missouri